Evans Katebe  (born March 17, 1960) was a Zambia football midfielder who played for Zambia in the 1978 African Cup of Nations and in 1980 Summer Olympics. He also played for Mufulira Wanderers.

References

External links

11v11 Profile
Sports Reference Profile

Zambian footballers
Zambia international footballers
1978 African Cup of Nations players
Footballers at the 1980 Summer Olympics
Olympic footballers of Zambia
Association football midfielders
1960 births
Living people